Innocent Esimu Wafula (born 1 April 1998) is a Ugandan footballer who plays as a defender for Ugandan Premier League club KCCA FC and the Uganda national team.

Club career
Wafula joined Chemelil Sugar in 2014 and made his debut against Muhoroni Youth on 22 February 2014. Chemelil Sugar won 2–0 and Wafula made both assists. He scored his first goal for Chemelil Sugar against Tusker on 23 April 2014 at Ruaraka Stadium Nairobi.

Wafula joined Gor Mahia in 2015 from Chemelil Sugar. In his debut with the club against KCB he scored and the match ended 1–0. In January 2017 he signed a new two-year contract deal at Gor Mahia. On 17 September 2017, Wafula scored a memorable goal for Gor Mahia against SoNy Sugar at Nyayo National Stadium and Gor Mahia unprecedented the 15th Kenyan Premier League title thus taking it for the third successive year.

Wafula joined Vipers SC in January 2019 and signed a three-year deal.,

Wafula joined Mbarara City FC in January 2021 from Vipers SC on a one-year contract. He made his debut on 13 April 2021 against MYDA.

On 24 August 2021, Wafula signed a one-year contract with KCCA FC.

International career
Wafula made his international debut for Uganda national team on 6 September 2021 against Mali during 2022 World Cup Qualifiers when he came in as a substitute replacing Emmanuel Okwi in the 69th minute. The match was played in St Mary's Stadium-Kitende and ended 0–0.

Personal life
Wafula was born to the late Bwire Ogutu and Mary Omoding of Busia District.

Honours

Club
Gor Mahia
 Kenyan Premier League: 2015, 2016, 2018
 Kenyan Super Cup: 2015, 2017
 KPL Top 8 Cup: 2015

References

External links
 
 
 Innocent Wafula at WhoScored
 

1998 births
Living people
Ugandan footballers
Uganda international footballers
Association football midfielders
Gor Mahia F.C. players
Kenyan Premier League players
Uganda Premier League players
Ugandan expatriate footballers
Expatriate footballers in Kenya
Ugandan expatriate sportspeople in Kenya
People from Busia District, Uganda